= Speed limits in the Faroe Islands =

Faroe Islands have the following general speed limits:

- In urban areas, 50 km/h
- Outside of urban areas, 80 km/h

Entering and leaving urban areas is indicated by a road sign. Speed limits can be altered by traffic signs. Such signs are valid until another sign changing them, or until the next intersection.

Speed limit for vehicles exceeding 3500 kg (trucks, buses) and vehicles towing trailers is set to 50 km/h in urban areas and 70 km/h outside of urban areas, even if higher limit is set by signs. There are other speed limits for specific kind of vehicles and vehicle combinations set in law.
